Swami Ayyappan is a Hindu deity.

Swami Ayyappan may also refer to:

 Swami Ayyappan (1975 film)
 Swami Ayyappan (2012 film)
 Swami Ayyappan (TV series)